Father Panik Village was a housing project located in Bridgeport, Connecticut. Ground was broken in 1939, and it opened as Yellow Mill Village, the first public housing project in the state. The Village was renamed in honor of Father Stephen Panik in 1955, a Catholic priest from Saints Cyril and Methodius Church who campaigned for affordable housing.
As it was built during World War II, the Bridgeport NAACP and local citizens rallied for this project to be built in 1939.

Location

The parcel of land abutted Saints Cyril and Methodius Church to the northwest, with Crescent Avenue and the Metro North train tracks as its northern border, directly south of the former Remington Arms ammunition plant. The east of the development stopped at the Yellow Mill River, and the western end stopped at Pembroke Street. Hamilton Street was the southern boundary. 

Since being torn down, the property was essentially split into three areas with the northeastern portion of the property becoming the Water View Park, the western half (the area south of the church) being converted into single and multi-family homes and the southeastern corner becoming Eastside Park, divided from Water View Park by the Waltersville Elementary & Middle School.

Opening
The 1939 groundbreaking was attended by Congressman Albert E. Austin and Governor Wilbur L. Cross, both of whom gave speeches to mark the occasion.
The Village opened in 1940, with 778 apartments in 47 brick buildings set on a  site on the east side of Bridgeport. Originally the population was 5,400 people, which would have made it the 51st largest town in the state at the time and was the 6th largest housing complex in the country.

Life in the village
The 1940 rent prices were $17–$26 a month, was approximately 20% of an average man's pay where the family included two parents and three children. In 1987 the rent was $516, or approximately 30% of a family of three's income, that family being a single parent and two children. Progressive for 1940, the development included bathrooms inside the apartments, hot and cold running water, gas stoves, a park and community center with a library, including 600 children's books.

In 1963, a fight at a baptismal party located in Father Panik Village led to the death of Pablo Gonzales, a father of four children. His attacker, Lorenzo Cora, was charged with murder as a result.

Decline and demolition
The Village slowly degraded into a slum and became a centralized point for crime and drug dealing in the 1980s, averaging 4 or 5 of the yearly 150 gun homicides in the state per year. In 1986 the city of Bridgeport razed all but fifteen of the housing units, and completed the demolition in 1994. In 1987 the population of the remaining Village was 2,500 people, including 816 families. Bridgeport's Mayor Thomas W. Bucci stated at that time that "Father Panik Village was in fact one of the worst-managed housing complexes in the nation."

References

Residential buildings completed in 1941
Buildings and structures in Bridgeport, Connecticut
Demolished buildings and structures in Connecticut
Public housing in the United States
Buildings and structures demolished in 1986
Buildings and structures demolished in 1994